Mahendravarman II or Mahendra Varma II was a king of the Pallava dynasty who ruled South India from 668–669 CE. He was the son of Narasimhavarma I, who ruled South India from 630–668 CE. He was succeeded by his son Paramesvaravarman I.

References

Pallava kings